
The Tanami Road, also known as the Tanami Track, Tanami Highway,  and the McGuire Track, is a road in Australia that runs between the Stuart Highway in the Northern Territory and the Great Northern Highway in Western Australia. It is also known as State Route 5 in the Northern Territory. It follows a cattle droving route northwest from the MacDonnell Ranges area of central Australia to Halls Creek in the Kimberley.

The Tanami Road is the most direct route from Alice Springs to the Kimberley, passing through the Tanami Desert. Along its route are Yuendumu, the tiny community of Yuelamu, and The Granites gold mine owned by Newmont Mining. In the Northern Territory it passes through land owned by the Aboriginal Warlpiri people, and in Western Australia it passes through pastoral land.

About 20% of the road is bitumen, the remainder is dirt and gravel and, although it is navigable by two-wheel drive vehicles, a four-wheel drive is recommended. Some parts of the road are prone to severe corrugations, making for an uncomfortable and slow drive at times. In January 2020, the federal government committed $235 million to upgrade and seal the road. The Western Australian government committed more than $250 million to sealing its portion of the road in 2022.

The mid-way point, Rabbit Flat, formerly a public roadhouse, was closed indefinitely at the end of 2010, so planning for this journey must take the lack of fuel and supplies into account. Carrying adequate fuel and water supplies is essential.

See also

 Canning Stock Route

References

Further reading
 Deckert, John.(1993)  Tanami Track  map -  Nhill, Vic : Westprint Heritage Maps, 1992. Scale 1:1,000,000 (E 127°20' -- E 134°00/S 17°25' -- S 24°00').

External links
Track details

Droving roads
Kimberley (Western Australia)
Roads in the Northern Territory
Tracks in remote areas of Western Australia
Tanami Desert